Przemysław Czyż (born 11 October 1972, in Warsaw) is a Polish diplomat, an ambassador to Macedonia (2011–2013) and Representative to the Palestinian National Authority (since 2019).

Life 
Czyż has graduated from University of Warsaw, Law Faculty. In 1996, he joined the Ministry of Foreign Affairs of Poland, specializing in legal and legislative issues. In 2003, he became member of civil service. Between 2006 and 2009 he has been director of the MFA Director General's Office. Afterwards, he was the director of the Legal and Public Procurement Office. From 2011 to 2013 he has been Poland ambassador to Macedonia. From 2014 to 2016 he was Senior Fellow and Deputy Head of the Center for Polish-Russian Dialogue and Understanding. Between 2016 and 2018 he was head of the Bureau for Infrastructure. On 1 August 2019, he started his service as a Representative of Poland to the Palestinian National Authority.

He is married, with two children. Besides Polish, he speaks English and Russian.

References 

1972 births
Ambassadors of Poland to North Macedonia
Living people
Diplomats from Warsaw
University of Warsaw alumni